Salhoutuonuo Kruse (born 1967) is an Indian politician from Nagaland. In 2023, She along with Hekani Jakhalu Kense became the first women from Nagaland to be elected to the Nagaland Legislative Assembly. She was sworn in as a Minister of Women Resource Development & Horticulture in the 5th Rio ministry, making her the first female Minister in the history of the Indian state of Nagaland.

Kruse was elected from the Western Angami Assembly constituency as a candidate of the Nationalist Democratic Progressive Party. She previously served as the President of the Angami Women Organization.

Early life 
Salhoutuonuo Kruneilie was born in 1967 to an Angami Naga family from Kiruphema. She did her schooling from Ministers' Hill Baptist Higher Secondary School in Kohima and later completed her graduation from Kohima College.

Career 
Kruse served as the President of the Angamimiapfü Mechü Krotho (now known as Angami Women Organization) from 2011 to 2014.

In 2023, Kruse was elected as a candidate of the Nationalist Democratic Progressive Party from the Western Angami Assembly constituency in the 2023 Nagaland Legislative Assembly election defeating Keneizhakho Nakhro, an independent candidate. She along with Hekani Jakhalu became the first ever elected women MLA from Nagaland.

Her late husband Kevisekho Kruse previously contested from the same constituency and party in the 2018 Nagaland Legislative Assembly election but lost to Keneizhakho Nakhro from the Naga People's Front party.

Personal life 
Salhoutuonuo was married to Kevisekho Kruse. They married on 2 October 1986 and had two daughters together. He later died from complications of COVID-19 on 4 June 2021 at age 60.

References

External links 

 
 

Living people
Naga people
1967 births
Nagaland MLAs 2023–2028
Ministers' Baptist Higher Secondary School alumni
Year of birth missing (living people)
People from Kiruphema
People from Khonoma
People from Kohima
Nationalist Democratic Progressive Party politicians